Graff is an unincorporated community in eastern Wright County, Missouri, United States. The community consists of a veterinary clinic and a post office, plus less than a half dozen houses.

A post office called Graff has been in operation since 1899. The community most likely was formerly called "Groff".  The Groff family were among the first settlers.

References

Unincorporated communities in Wright County, Missouri
Unincorporated communities in Missouri